Khong Island or Don Khong is the largest island and the seat of administration in the Si Phan Don riverine archipelago located in the Mekong River, Khong District, Champasak Province, southern Laos.

Its population is mainly concentrated in the two villages Muang Saen (west) and Muang Khong (east); the latter is the de facto capital of the island as well as the regional seat of government. 

Locals tend to travel on longtail boats.

Islands of the Mekong River
Populated places in Champasak Province
River islands of Laos